Changjoon Justin Lee is a neuroscientist specializing in the field of glioscience. He served as the Director of Center for Neuroscience at the Korea Institute of Science and Technology and later founded the WCI Center for Functional Connectomics as part of the World Class Institute Program. In 2015, he established the Center for Glia-Neuron Interaction before becoming co-director of the IBS Center for Cognition and Sociality and head of the Cognitive Glioscience Group in 2018. He has been on the editorial boards of the journals Molecular Brain and Molecular Pain and is a chief editor of Experimental Neurobiology.

Early life and education 
Born in a rural area of Gimpo City, Lee interacted with the natural world and raised livestock at home which inspired an interest in biology. After completion of middle school, he left South Korea and moved to the US at age 15 and started high school at Rich Central High School, Olympia Fields, Illinois. While under an Illinois State Scholarship and working as a junior research assistant in the lab of Professor Louis Seiden, Lee majored in chemistry and obtained his B.A. from the University of Chicago in 1990. He then moved to New York where he enrolled in the Graduate School of Arts and Sciences of Columbia University where he earned his M.S. and Ph.D. in neurophysiology under the Department of Physiology and Cellular Biophysics. His doctoral thesis adviser was Professor Amy B. MacDermott, whose lab he worked in as a research technician and later as a graduate research assistant upon recipient of his M.S.

Before the first year of his joint M.S. and Ph.D. study, he worked as a research assistant in Emily Foster's lab at Michael Reese Hospital. Within Columbia University, he was also a research technician in Professor Martin Low's lab.

Career
He then completed a three-year postdoc position in the lab of Professor Traynelis at Emory University in the Department of Pharmacology. His sponsor was Dr. Stephen Traynelis and his research scope was the modulation of NMDA receptors by protease-activated receptors. During the postdoc position, he visited the Korea Institute of Science and Technology (KIST) and was influenced by Shin Hee-sup to join KIST, which he did in 2004 as a senior research scientist. Working at KIST, he became a principle research scientist in 2010 and later a tenured research scientist in 2017.

Lee participated in establishing brain science research infrastructure at KIST, first as a founding member of the Center for Neuroscience with director Shin Hee-sup. The Center is now a constituent of KIST's Brain Science Institute. He also helped to establish the Neuroscience Program of the University of Science and Technology (UST). He also participated as a founding faculty of KU-KIST School of Convergence Technology. As a part of World Class Institute program (WCI), he founded the WCI Center for Functional Connectomics in 2009 and served as the organizing deputy director of the center.

In November 2018, Lee joined the IBS Center for Cognition and Sociality as a co-director with Shin Hee-sup, who he had previously met and worked with at KIST. Shin led the Social Neuroscience Group until his retirement in 2020 while Lee leads the Cognitive Glioscience Group which focuses on four research areas: molecular glioscience, glia-neuron interaction, glial plasticity and cognition, and gliopathy.

GABA synthesis and release from glia
Lee's research group has contributed to the field of gliotransmission by creating several seminal publications on the channel-mediated gamma-Aminobutyric acid (GABA) and glutamate release from astrocytes. They later identified the biosynthetic pathway for astrocyte GABA and found monoamine oxidase B to be the key enzyme for GABA production which raised the possibility that astrocytes can directly participate in cognitive processes via astrocytic GABA.

His team also found a connection with GABA from reactive astrocytes and impaired memory in mouse models of Alzheimer's disease, leading them to propose astrocytic GABA might be a diagnostic tool, biomarker, and therapeutic target for both neurological diseases Alzheimer's and Parkinson's. The research is notable as it revealed that astrocytes, like neurons, play a significant role in cognitive processes. The findings also resulted in a technology transfer to MegaBioWood which will be prepared for a phase I clinical trial in 2019. In response to his Alzheimer's research related to causes of memory loss, Lee received the Science Day 2017 Presidential Medal of Honor.

Molecular mechanism of glutamate and d-serine release from glia
It is known that glutamate is released from astrocytes but the exact method of their release, i.e., the release mechanism, has been controversial. His team went on to discover two models of glutamate release; a fast mode through TREK-1 in the K2P channel and a slow mode through the Best1 channel in hippocampal astrocytes. They found that Best1-controlled glutamate release is related to receptor mediated synaptic plasticity in the hippocampus when PAR1 is activated. These papers also show that the key modulator for excitation-inhibition balance in the brain is mainly dependent on the levels of glutamate and GABA. In addition to glutamate, Best1 can also release d-serine, which can act as a co-agonist of NMDA receptors to participate in synaptic plasticity.

Astrocytic volume transient and brain plasticity
Some of his glioscience-related research has been with identifying and characterizing several astrocytic ion channels. His teams learned that the astrocytic two-pore potassium channel K2P has a passive conductance with a subunit composition of a heterodimer of TWIK-1 and TREK-1. They also put forth the proposal that the heterodimer of TWIK-1 and TREK-1 could be a potential therapeutic target for epilepsy, depression, and anxiety disorders caused by concentrations of potassium ion. The team found that the astrocytic volume-regulated anion channel (VRAC) is tweety-homolog (Ttyh), which is notable as VRAC was proposed to be leucine-rich repeat-containing protein 8 (LRRC8). Lee's research also showed that the astrocytic volume change through aquaporin-4 water channel is critical for synaptic plasticity. They demonstrated that a change in the volume can directly affect spatial memory in mice, meanwhile it affects memory and language-association learning in humans.

Reactive gliosis and neurodegeneration
Reactive gliosis has often referred to as the basis for neuroinflammation, which has implicated them in Alzheimer's disease and other neurodegenerative diseases but their in vivo functions have not been fully tested due to the lack of an appropriate experimental model. When Lee's team developed an astrocyte-specific toxin receptor model, they found that the astrocytes selectively became reactive, which identifies severe reactive astrocytes as a key factor in Alzheimer's disease neurodegeneration.

Software development 
Lee has been involved in the development of several research-related software projects, including Mini Analysis and Easy Articles, both distributed by Synaptosoft. His nervous system research software was the reason Lee was scouted by Shin Hee-sup to conduct research in Korea.

Honors and awards 
 2020: Korea's Top 5 Bio-Field Research Results and News, POSTECH Biological Research Information Center
 2017: Science Day 2017, Korea Science & Technology Development Presidential Medal of Honor
 2016: Kyung-Ahm Prize, Kyung-Ahm Education & Cultural Foundation
 2014: FILA Basic Science Award, Korean Academy of Science and Technology
 2014: Jang Jin Award, Korean Society for Brain and Neuroscience
 2013: Dec. Star Professor Award, University of Science & Technology
 2013: Aug. Outstanding Mentor Award, University of Science & Technology
 2012: Dec. Best Mentor Award, University of Science & Technology
 2011: Jun. Best Mentor Award, University of Science & Technology
 2011: Jun. Outstanding Mentor Award, University of Science & Technology
 2011: Scientist of the Year Award, KIST
 2011: 100 Leaders in Korea, The Dong-a Ilbo
 2011: Outstanding Research Team Award, KIST
 2010: Outstanding Researcher Award, Prime Minister of Korea
 2010: Dec. Scientist of the Month Award, Korean Ministry of Science & Technology
 2010: Dec. Scientist of the Month Award, KIST
 2009: Outstanding Project Award, KIST
 2009: Jun. Outstanding Teacher Award, University of Science & Technology
 2009: May Outstanding Mentor Award, University of Science & Technology
 2009: Feb. Outstanding Researcher Award, KIST
 2003: Outstanding Researcher Award, Association of Korean Neuroscientists
 2000: Outstanding Researcher Award, Association of Korean Neuroscientists

Scientific society 
 2016: President of Korean Neuroglia Society
 2016: General Secretary of Korean Society for Brain and Neural Sciences
 2015: Secretariat of Korean Society for Brain and Neural Sciences
 1996: Member of Society for Neuroscience
 1985: National Honors Society

Journal editing
 2017–Present: Editor-in-chief, Experimental Neurobiology
 2008–2017: Editorial Board & Managing Editor, Molecular Brain
 2004–Present: Editorial board, Molecular Pain

See also
 Alexei Verkhratsky
 Maiken Nedergaard
 Baljit S. Khakh
 Rudolf Virchow
 Ben Barres
 Boston University CTE Center and Brain Bank

References

External links 
 IBS Center for Cognition and Sociality – Cognitive Glioscience Group
 C. Justin Lee – Google Scholar
 Experimental Neurobiology

Living people
American neuroscientists
Columbia Graduate School of Arts and Sciences alumni
University of Chicago alumni
Institute for Basic Science
1966 births
People from Gimpo
South Korean scientists